Henry Paul "Bob" Gude, Jr. (February 25, 1918 – October 6, 1998) was an American football player. He was a prominent center for the Vanderbilt Commodores of Vanderbilt University. Gude was frequently compared to former Commodore greats Carl Hinkle and Pete Gracey. "He was Vanderbilt's main defensive cog." Gude was twice All-SEC. Gude was named to the Fox-Movietone All-America team in 1941. He was drafted in the 14th round of the 1942 NFL Draft by the Chicago Bears. While serving in World War II, Gude was a sergeant who played army football under Wallace Wade.

See also
 1941 College Football All-America Team

References

1918 births
1998 deaths
American football centers
Chicago Bears players
Philadelphia Eagles players
Vanderbilt Commodores football players
All-American college football players
Players of American football from Memphis, Tennessee
United States Army personnel of World War II
United States Army soldiers